Fortaleza de São José de Macapá is a fort located in Macapá, Amapá in Brazil.

See also
Military history of Brazil

References

External links

Sao Jose
Buildings and structures in Amapá
Portuguese colonial architecture in Brazil